Rugby sevens at the 2014 Summer Youth Olympics was held from 17 to 20 August at the Youth Olympic Sports Park in Nanjing, China. The 2014 Games marked the debut of Rugby sevens at the Youth Olympics as it was voted an Olympic sport for the 2016 Summer Olympics.

Qualification

A total of 6 teams will participate in each gender. Each National Olympic Committee (NOC) can enter a maximum of 2 teams of 12 athletes, 1 per each gender. As hosts, China was given a spot to compete in the girls’ tournament. The six male and five other female teams were decided at the 2013 Rugby World Cup Sevens held in Moscow, Russia from 28–30 June 2013. The top ranking nation from each of the six regional unions qualified a team (in the girls’ tournament NACRA and CONSUR were combined).

However, due to the rule where nations may only qualify a single team sport (field hockey, football, handball and rugby sevens) in each gender some teams had to make a choice in which sport to participate in. Any declined teams were reallocated to the next best ranked team at the 2013 Rugby World Cup Sevens in the same regional union. Should none remain the spot would go to the next best ranked team not yet qualified.

To be eligible to participate at the Youth Olympics athletes must have been born between 1 January 1996 and 31 December 1997.

Participating teams

Schedule

The schedule was released by the Nanjing Youth Olympic Games Organizing Committee.

All times are CST (UTC+8)

Medal summary

Medal table

Events

References

External links
Official Results Book – Rugby

 
rugby sevens
2014
International rugby union competitions hosted by China
2014 rugby sevens competitions